Chrysomma is a songbird genus. Chrysomma is quite closely related to the parrotbills, and is therefore a member of the family Paradoxornithidae.

Species 
The genus contains two species:

The rufous-tailed babbler was formerly placed in this genus but has been moved to the monotypic Moupinia.

References 

 
Bird genera
Taxa named by Edward Blyth
Taxonomy articles created by Polbot